An endangered language is a language that is at risk of falling out of use, generally because it has few surviving speakers. If it loses all of its native speakers, it becomes an extinct language. UNESCO defines four levels of language endangerment between "safe" (not endangered) and "extinct": There are primarily eight languages that were spoken in Canada around 2010.
 Vulnerable
 Definitely endangered
 Severely endangered
 Critically endangered

Changes in Canadian Endangered Languages

Terminology 
 Phonological Process: Patterns that young children use to simplify  adult speech 
 Soundless Vowels: Inaudible, unvoiced vowels or syllables
 Language Death: The death of the last speaker of a language
 Phoneme: Sound syllable
 Contraction: Shortened version of a written or spoken word 
 Elision: Omission of a sound or syllable when speaking
 Metatheses: the transposition (changing place) of sounds or letters in words

Oneida (Iroquoian Language) 
 Critically Endangered
 Visual Information/Cues teach the language
There is a "phonological process," or patterns used to simplify speech in the Oneida language that has been passed down for generations, this process is described as the loss of voicing in the vowel of the last syllable of a word. This process is vital to the preservation of the language, and has been changing among the speakers, such that some speakers have introduced a degree of voiced vowels in these final forms, which poses additional stress on the small population of speakers. The introduction in voicing the last syllable in words that typically are unvoiced changes the traditional morphology of the language, pushing the original dialect towards language death, especially since the majority of speakers are older in age.

Blackfoot (Algonquian Language) 
 Definitely Endangered
 Visual Information/Cues teach the language 
The Blackfoot language features the loss of voicing in the last syllable of a word, which is typically inaudible. Certain inflections, or the use of inaudible vowels has been identified as "old Blackfoot" (traditional), and are not in frequent use by younger speakers. Similarly, a minority of Blackfoot speakers use the "soundless" suffixes, which is pushing the traditional language towards more extreme language endangerment and potentially language death.

Chipewyan (Athapaskan Language) 
 Definitely Endangered
 Most speakers from Mid-to-late adulthood
The Chipewyan language exhibits morphological characteristics that are far more complex than the majority of European languages. This includes conditioning of tone and morphology of phonemes, as well as frequent contractions, elisions, metatheses, and consonantal substitutions. Chipewyan is mainly endangered due to its complex structure, which makes it difficult to decipher the morphological code, as well as the fact that the majority of the speakers are in their mid-late adulthood.

Assiniboine 
Critically Endangered
Also called  Nakoda or Hohe
Assinibone is one of the language divisions out of five main language divisions within the Dakotan group of the Siouan family. The sound of this language differs from the other languages in the group because it merges voiceless stops with voiced stops. There are reports that syllabics to have been used by Assinibone speakers. (A written character to represent a syllable).  The Assiniboine language is spread over 2 communities in Canada, and is mainly used by older adults.

Central  Ojibwe 
Definitely Endangered
Also called Anishinaabemowin, Ojibway, and Chippewa
There are about 8,000 speakers in the central Ojibwe language, and it has been spread over 16 communities in Canada. The language is spoken from Ontario Canada to Manitoba. It is also spoken in places from Michigan to Montana next to the Great Lakes which is the home of the Ojibwe people. The language today is spoken by people over the age of 70. The people of the Ojibwe language note that double vowels in their language are treated as standing for unit sounds, therefore they are alphabetized after corresponding single values.

Lakota (Siouan Language) 
 Critically Endangered
 Mutually intelligible with Dakota language
There are about 6,000 speakers in the Northern Plain States of North Dakota and South Dakota. Most native speakers are in their mid-50s. There is a growing interest to revitalize the language. At the Red Cloud Indian school, there are immersion classes for children to teach the language. However, at the moment, there are no children on the Standing Rock Indian Reservation that are fluent in the language. Within the next ten years, there will be children fluent in Lakota.

Dakota (Siouan Language) 
 Definitely Endangered
 Mutually intelligible with Lakota language
There are about 20,000 native speakers, primarily in the North Dakota and South Dakota area, about 4,000 of which live in Minnesota. Dakota Wicohon is an after school camp that helps children learn the language, since it is not taught in the government-run boarding schools for American Indian youth. To help preservation efforts, technology like phraselators come into play, allowing learners to type in the words they want or orally speak the word they want and the machine will find it for them.</ref>

Dogrib (Northern Athabaskan Language) 
 Vulnerable 
 Also called Tlinchon
There are about 2,640 speakers of the language in the Canadian Northwest Territories from the Great Slave Lake to the Great Bear Lake. Dogrib phonology is rather intricate and is organized into 5 levels. The first person to write a book in Dogrib was Herb Zimmerman, who translated the Bible into the language in 1981. Unlike many other Native American languages, there are children who are fluent in the language.

Kaska (Athabaskan Language) 
 Severely Endangered
This was typically a First Nations speaking language, and mainly lived in northern British Columbia and some from southeast Yukon in Canada. People who speak Kaska today still live within the British Columbia and Yukon Territory area. The speakers are elders, such as grandparents, and their children and grandchildren would speak English. First Nations have started work to re-create and preserve their heritage language.

Ottawa (Ojibwe Language) 
 Severely Endangered
 Also called Odawa
The number of people who speak the Ottawa dialect is unknown, though it is predicted to be around 13,000. Native communities received $5 million a year for 7 years (2007–2014) to help them in their efforts to preserve their languages and teach it to their children. The language is written with Latin letters and is a dialect of the Ojibwe language. Many descendants of migrants now live in Kansas and Oklahoma.

Stoney (Siouan Language) 
 Vulnerable
 Also called Nakoda or Alberta Assiniboine
There are roughly 3,200 people who speak Stoney in the Northern Plains and the Alberta province of Canada. Stoney has a Latin alphabet. The stress is one of the harder aspects about the language. The Stoney Indian Language Project was created to help make a standard format of the Stoney language. The project created 6 books for adults and children, as well as a videotape for third graders.

Potawatomi (Central Algonquian Language) 
 Critically Endangered
 Related to languages such as Cree, Ojibwa, Menominee, Kickapoo, and Odawa
The Potawatomi Language is critically endangered because there are only 52 fluent speakers left surrounding the Great Lakes region in Michigan. Within a decade, those who are fluent (the majority being the elderly) will soon be dead, causing the culture to die out with them, along with the knowledge of history that has been passed down from previous generations. English has become the predominant language spoken in homes due to the halt of parents speaking Potawatomi to children from 20 to more than 50 years ago. Currently there are no teachings of the language but there are revitalization efforts to bring back the language and the culture that could possibly be gone forever.

Tuscarora (Northern Iroquoian Language) 
 Critically Endangered
 With migration southward, historically situated in North Carolina
Tuscarora entails complex morphology dealing with the copying of words, roots, stems, and affixes. There was a time where the Tuscarora language was spoken 'as the mother tongue,' used for all situations, (formal and informal) but now there are approximately only four to five remaining elders who are fluent in the language. All of the elders are around the ages of seventy to eighty years old, where a possible result is the extinction of the Tuscarora language.

Cayuga (Northern Iroquoian Language) 
 Critically Endangered 
 The Native American Cayuga speaking people were split into two geographically separate groups.
The Native American Cayuga speaking people are located in Oklahoma and Ontario. With the splitting of the people into two geographical locations, they now begin to differ in terms of language usage, morphology and phonology. In the setting of Oklahoma, Cayuga has become influenced by other tribes and has to a certain extent, lost their original vocabulary. Cayuga contains a pitch accent where the placement of it can be predicted by metrical structure and constraints on the structure of the syllables.

Upper Tanana Language 
 Critically Endangered
The Upper Tanana Language originally was spoken in only five villages, each with a different dialect. Those villages were Beaver Creek, Scottie Creek, Northway, Nabesna, and Tetlin. Today, the language is only spoken by about 95 people, above the age of 50, in eastern interior Alaska. Depending on the dialect, the Upper Tanana Language has about six to seven phonemic vowels. the primary difference between the dialects is by the pitch of the tone. Also a major factor in the split of different dialects is that different dialects have different vowel inventories.

Nootka Language 
 Severely Endangered
Despite misinterpretation of studies which describe the phonetic inventory of Nootka, these studies do not suggest that its phonemic inventory is the main reason why the Nootka language may be severely endangered. A process known as glottalization is a key factor in being able to articulate certain sounds in the language, called ejective consonants. Though these sounds are not found in English, they are not linguistically rare. Many languages with a large body of speakers, including Arabic and Amharic, contain these sounds, an observation which immediately discredits this theory. It is clear that Nootka, like all Canadian aboriginal languages, is endangered due to social factors alone.

References

Languages of Canada
Canada